Coolidge Reservation is a nature reserve located in Manchester-by-the-Sea, Massachusetts.  The property is owned by The Trustees of Reservations.

History 
The reservation is located on Coolidge Point, a peninsula once owned by—and named for—the Coolidge family.  The reservation property includes the former site of the Coolidge's "Marble Palace", a Georgian-style mansion designed in 1902 by Charles McKim.  Although the mansion no longer stands, the home's grounds are preserved as the "Ocean Lawn".

The reservation was established in 1992.

References

External links 
 The Trustees of Reservations: Coolidge Reservation

The Trustees of Reservations
Protected areas of Essex County, Massachusetts
Open space reserves of Massachusetts
Manchester-by-the-Sea, Massachusetts
Protected areas established in 1992
1992 establishments in Massachusetts